The 2001 Generali Ladies Linz is the 2001 Tier II WTA Tour tournament of the annually-held Generali Ladies Linz tennis tournament. It was the 15th edition of the tournament and was held from October 22–28, 2001 at the Design Center Linz. First-seeded Lindsay Davenport won the singles title.

Points and prize money

Point distribution

Prize money

* per team

Singles main draw entrants

Seeds 

Rankings are as of 15 October 2001.

Other entrants 
The following players received wildcards into the singles main draw:
  Lindsay Davenport
  Evelyn Fauth
  Barbara Schwartz

The following players received entry from the qualifying draw:
  Anastasia Myskina
  Tatiana Panova
  Rossana de los Ríos
  Alexandra Stevenson

The following player received entry as a lucky loser:
  Denisa Chládková

Withdrawals 

  Venus Williams → replaced by  Denisa Chládková

Doubles main draw entrants

Seeds 

Rankings are as of 15 October 2001.

Other entrants
The following pair received wildcards into the doubles main draw:
  Denisa Chládková /  Barbara Schwartz

The following pair received entry from the qualifying draw:
  Petra Mandula /  Patricia Wartusch

Finals

Singles

 Lindsay Davenport defeated  Jelena Dokic, 6–4, 6–1.
 It was Davenport's 37th WTA singles title, and 7th title of the year. Davenport was also the defending champion.

Doubles

 Jelena Dokic /  Nadia Petrova defeated  Els Callens /  Chanda Rubin, 6–1, 6–4.
 It was Dokic's 1st WTA doubles title. It was Petrova's 2nd WTA doubles title, and second of the year. This was their first doubles title together as a pair.

References

Generali Ladies Linz
Linz Open
Generali Ladies Linz
Generali Ladies Linz
Generali